In psychology, the care perspective focuses on people in terms of their connectedness with others, interpersonal communication, relationships with others, and concern for others.

See also
Carol Gilligan
Moral development

References

Human communication